The Leader of the Opposition in Maharashtra Legislative Council is an elected Member of Maharashtra Legislative Council who leads the official opposition in the Upper house of the Maharashtra Legislature. The Leader of the opposition Maharashtra Legislative Council is the Legislature chairperson of the party with the most seats after the government party.

Leaders of the opposition
The council's opposition parties elect a Leader of the Opposition. This is commonly the leader of the largest non-government party, and is recognized as such by the chairman. The following is the list of leaders of the opposition in the council.

Deputy Leaders of the opposition

Ashok Arjunrao Jagtap - Bhai Jagtap
17 August - 2022 - Incumbent

See also
 List of chief ministers of Maharashtra
 List of Leaders of the House of the Maharashtra Legislative Council
 List of Leader of the Opposition of the Maharashtra Legislative Assembly

References

Maharashtra Legislative Council
 
Leaders of the Opposition in Maharashtra